Andrew Douglas Alexander Thomas Bruce, 11th Earl of Elgin and 15th Earl of Kincardine,  (born 17 February 1924), styled Lord Bruce before 1968, is a Scottish peer and Chief of Clan Bruce.

Background and education
The eldest son of Edward Bruce, 10th Earl of Elgin and the Honourable Katherine Elizabeth Cochrane, daughter of the Baron Cochrane of Cults, he was educated at Eton and at Balliol College, Oxford. On 12 September 1943, Bruce was commissioned as Second Lieutenant in the 3rd (Armoured) Bn Scots Guards and was wounded during Operation Bluecoat, the break out from Normandy in August 1944. He was invalided out of the army on 24 October 1946, with the honorary rank of lieutenant. On 4 April 1951, he was appointed an instructor in the Army Cadet Force, with the rank of Lieutenant. In July 1963, by then the County Cadet Commandant for Fife, he was awarded the Cadet Forces Medal. He resigned his commission on 19 April 1965, retaining the honorary rank of lieutenant-colonel. Since 1970, he has been Colonel-in-Chief of the 31 Combat Engineer Regiment (The Elgins), and was Honorary Colonel of the 153 (Highland) Transport Regiment from 1976 to 1986.

Lord Elgin is also the Honorary Colonel of No 7 Royal Canadian Army Cadet Corps, which is affiliated with the Elgin Regiment, but is not part of it. No 7 is the second oldest extant Corps in the Royal Canadian Army Cadets of Canada and one of only two that have colours. The Corps wears distinctive shoulder flashes backed with the Bruce tartan. (Not even the Elgin Regiment wears them.)

Career
Elgin has held a number of business appointments, including as President of the Scottish Amicable Life Assurance Society (1975–1994), and Chairman of the National Savings Committee for Scotland. He was President of the Royal Scottish Automobile Club, and the Scottish motor racing team, Ecurie Ecosse.

He was appointed a Justice of the Peace in 1951, was Deputy Lieutenant of Fife 1955–1987, and Lord Lieutenant 1987–1999. In 1980 he was appointed by Queen Elizabeth II as her Lord High Commissioner to the General Assembly of the Church of Scotland and reappointed in 1981. In 1982 HM The Queen installed him as a Knight of the Thistle. He was awarded the Canadian Forces Decoration in 1981, and the Royal Norwegian Order of St. Olav in 1994. He is a former Captain of the Royal Company of Archers and a former convenor of the Standing Council of Scottish Chiefs.

He was County Cadet Commandant for Fife from 1952 to 1965, Brigade President of the Boys' Brigade from 1966 to 1985, and Grand Master Mason of Scotland from 1961 to 1965.

He is a Freeman of Bridgetown, Regina, Saskatchewan, Port Elgin, Winnipeg, Manitoba, St. Thomas, Ontario, and Moose Jaw, Saskatchewan. Lord Elgin is a Past President of the Royal Caledonian Curling Club, and is the Life President of the Broomhall Curling Club. He skippered the Scottish curling teams that defeated the Governor-General of Canada's teams in a series of matches in Ottawa in 1982.

Lord Elgin is Chief of Clan Bruce and President of the Bruce Family Organization which is the main association for members of the Bruce family.

Honours

Honorary Military Appointments

Family
In 1959 he married Victoria Mary Usher and they have five children:
Charles Edward Bruce, styled Lord Bruce, married twice: 1) m. 1990 Amanda Grimes née Movius (divorced 1996) 2) m. 5 July 2001 Dr. Alice Enders
The Hon. Alexander Bruce
The Hon. Adam Bruce
The Lady Georgina Bruce
The Lady Antonia Bruce.

The Countess of Elgin is a Patron of the Royal Caledonian Ball. The Earl succeeded to the earldoms and other family titles on the death of his father in 1968.

Notes

References
Kidd, Charles, Williamson, David (editors). Debrett's Peerage and Baronetage (1990 edition). New York: St Martin's Press, 1990, 
"Who's Who" (2011 edition). A & C Black Publishers Ltd; 163rd Revised edition (6 December 2010)

External links

Andrew Bruce, 11th Earl of Elgin

 

1924 births
Living people
11
15
Knights of the Thistle
People educated at Eton College
Alumni of Balliol College, Oxford
Scots Guards officers
British Army personnel of World War II
Lord-Lieutenants of Fife
Boys' Brigade
Scottish Freemasons
Members of the Royal Company of Archers
Andrew
Elgin